Gilda Olvidado's Magkano ang Iyong Dangal? is a 2010 Philippine romantic drama television series loosely based on Laurice Guillen's 1989 film of the same name that starred Christopher de Leon, Zsa Zsa Padilla, and Joel Torre, with Jestoni Alarcon, Princess Punzalan, and Michael Locsin.

The film was produced and released by Seiko Films. Created by Gilda Olvidado and directed by Chito S. Roño, the series stars Bangs Garcia as Carmela Martirez-Morales, and Karylle as Tanya Almeda, together with leading men Rayver Cruz and Sid Lucero, with an ensemble cast consisting of Nikki Valdez, Bing Pimentel, Paw Diaz, Beverly Salviejo, Martin del Rosario, Bettina Carlos, Debraliz Borres, Rico Barrera, Jocelyn Oxlade, Dick Israel, and Erika Padilla, with Christopher Roxas, Jake Roxas, Guji Lorenzana, and Mylene Dizon. The series premiered on ABS-CBN's Hapontastic afternoon block from January 25 to May 14, 2010, replaang Nagsimula sa Puso and was replaced by Rosalka.

It is also the first film to TV remake to use Gilda Olvidado's storywork for the network under her helm.

Overview

Original film
Magkano ang Iyong Dangal? was a 1989 film produced and released by Seiko Films. It starred Christopher de Leon as Paolo, Zsa Zsa Padilla as Era, and Joel Torre as Larry, with Jestoni Alarcon, Princess Punzalan, and Michael Locsin. It was written by Gilda Olvidado and directed by Laurice Guillen.

Production
ABS-CBN bought Magkano ang Iyong Dangal? in 2007 from Seiko Films as part of Sineserye Presents. The main role was first offered to Kris Aquino then later given to Roxanne Guinoo.

In a November 2009 episode of SNN: Showbiz News Ngayon, the series was announced to star Roxanne Guinoo, Rayver Cruz, and Sid Lucero and to be directed by Chito Rono, with the tentative title Mahal Na Mahal Kita.

On ABS-CBN's Trade Show for 2010, it was announced that the final title is Magkano Ang Iyong Dangal? and it is a remake of the 1989 film with the same title.

In December 2009, the management decided to give the main role to Bangs Garcia, because of some unsettled issues with Guinoo.

Synopsis
Nilo (Sid Lucero) and Carmela's (Bangs Garcia) love will be tested by problems and challenges surrounding their families. They will be separated temporarily by circumstances beyond their control, but fate will bring them back together again.

Nilo and Carmela will prove that their love could overcome everything. But mistakes from the past will not make life easy for them, an old friend Troy (Rayver Cruz) will come back to get Carmela from Nilo. Unbeknownst to the couple, Troy will orchestrate a plan to separate them. He will try to buy off Carmela's love by forcing her to sell her own dignity to save the man she loves. Troy's ploy will test Nilo and Carmela's love for each other. Theirs is a love that will transcend all mistakes, all problems, and all challenges. Nilo and Carmela will prove that love indeed has no price, it is unconditional.

Cast and characters

Main cast
Bangs Garcia as Carmela Martirez-Morales - She was raised by her loving Mother Rodora. Carmela grew up to be a very obedient daughter to her Mother. She's a self-sacrificing, hard working and a very kind girl who dreams of having a complete family. Nilo is her one and only love. He's the only man who has tried to save her in any possible way. She will do anything to fight for their love and along the way Carmela will learn that for the love of her life she will give up even her honor— this is the real meaning of true love.
Karylle as Tanya Almeda- a new character was introduced at the middle part of the soap. Tanya is an environmentalist seeking justice for her boyfriend who was framed up and killed. She will meet Nilo as she conducts her investigation regarding a company violating environmental laws and involved in framing up her boyfriend. She will help Nilo to prove his innocence and do whatever it takes to protect him. A thing which she was not able to do with his boyfriend.
Rayver Cruz as Troy Sandoval - The son of Esther. He grew up with a deep longing for affection and attention from his Mother and Sibling. When he was young he was friends with Carmela and Nilo and finally found in Carmela the love he wanted to receive from his family. When Carmela left him he felt rejected and soon his love for Carmela turned into obsession. He returned from the U.S totally changed; he became suave and sophisticated with a reputation of being a risk taker on the business. He has only one intention—to win Carmela back.
Sid Lucero as Nilo Morales - Growing up with Dioning, who did nothing but blame him for every misfortune they encountered, Nilo learned to be self-reliant at an early age. Although he tends to be naughty and proud he's also good in school and always gets high grades. Nilo is ambitious and he yearns to be rich so that he could be a good provider to his family; so he would not have to depend on other people again. His one true love is Carmela. From Carmela he will realize the real meaning of love that it is just about fulfilling the other person's dreams. Love is giving that other person your whole self without inhibitions.

Supporting cast
Nikki Valdez as Liezette
Bing Pimentel as Esther
Paw Diaz as Diane
Beverly Salviejo as Dioning
Martin del Rosario as Biboy
Bettina Carlos as Alona
Debraliz Borres as Saling
Rico Barrera as Edwin
Jocelyn Oxlade as Monique
Dick Israel as George
Erika Padilla as Jenny

Extended cast
Christopher Roxas as Barry Abarrientos
Jake Roxas as Andrew Marquez
Mylene Dizon as Rita Robles

Special participation
Emilio Garcia as Roman
Mickey Ferriols as Rodora
Ella Cruz as Young Carmela
Makisig Morales as Young Nilo
Joshua Dionisio as Young Troy
Jane Oineza as Young Alona
Enola Alvarez as Young Tanya

Guest cast
Tom Olivar
Reb Sibal
Jubail Andres
Manuel Chua
Raymond Concepcion
Jacq Yu

Production crew

Reception
The television series remake was conceived to change the revivals names and story plot from the 1989 version which was directed by Laurice Guillen the plot was conceived from the original storyline to present day times.

Launch
Magkano ang Iyong Dangal was launched as one of the ABS-CBN offering for the 60th celebration of Filipino Soap Opera (Ika-60 taon ng Pinoy Soap Opera). Together with upcoming series such as Rubi, Kung Tayo'y Magkakalayo, Habang May Buhay, Kokey at Ako, Tanging Yaman, Agua Bendita, and a series of Precious Hearts Romances Presents seasonal episodes. The shows were launched during the ABS-CBN Trade Launch for the first quarter of 2010, entitled Bagong Simula (New Beginning).

See also
List of programs broadcast by ABS-CBN
List of ABS-CBN drama series

References

External links
 

ABS-CBN drama series
2010 Philippine television series debuts
2010 Philippine television series endings
Philippine romance television series
Television series by Star Creatives
Live action television shows based on films
Television shows based on comics
Filipino-language television shows
Television shows filmed in the Philippines